Hustle & Flow is a 2005 American drama film written and directed by Craig Brewer and produced by John Singleton and Stephanie Allain. It stars Terrence Howard as a Memphis hustler and pimp who faces his aspiration to become a rapper. It also stars Anthony Anderson, Taryn Manning, Taraji P. Henson, Paula Jai Parker, Elise Neal, DJ Qualls and Ludacris.

Hustle & Flow was released in the United States on July 22, 2005, by Paramount Pictures. It received positive reviews from critics, with praise directed at the performances (particularly those of Howard and Henson), Brewer's script and direction, and the soundtrack. It was also a commercial success, grossing $23.5 million against a production budget of $2.8 million.

The film received numerous accolades and nominations, and was nominated twice at the 78th Academy Awards for Best Actor (Howard) and Academy Award for Best Original Song for Three 6 Mafia's song "It's Hard out Here for a Pimp", winning the latter and becoming the second hip hop song to win an Academy Award, after Eminem's "Lose Yourself."

Plot

DJay is a pimp and drug dealer living in Memphis, Tennessee, who is dissatisfied with his life, and is going through a midlife crisis. After reacquainting himself with an old friend and sound technician, Key, DJay decides to make hip hop music.

Key and his sound-mixer friend Shelby help DJay put together several songs in which he expresses the frustrations of struggling to survive in the ghetto. DJay proves his talent, and his first song appears to have a decent chance of getting local radio play.

The group experiences setbacks throughout the creative process. DJay must hustle those around him in order to procure equipment and recording time, and Key's relationship with his wife becomes strained. DJay throws out one of his prostitutes, Lexus, along with her infant son, for ridiculing him. DJay's pregnant prostitute, Shug, joins in the creative process, singing hooks. The group eventually records several tracks, including "Whoop That Trick" and "It's Hard out Here for a Pimp". After their first recording, DJay gains romantic feelings toward Shug, even sharing a passionate kiss. 

DJay's friend Arnel informs him that Skinny Black, a successful Memphis rapper, will be returning for a Fourth of July party. DJay gains admittance under the pretext of providing marijuana, with the true intention of giving Black his demo tape. Black is dismissive at first, but DJay successfully persuades him into taking the tape.

Before leaving the party, DJay discovers that a drunken Black has destroyed his tape. DJay confronts Black who insults him. In a fit of rage, DJay nearly beats Black to death but attempts to resuscitate him. A member of Black's entourage enters the bathroom and pulls out his gun. DJay shoots the man in his arm with Black's gun and escapes.

DJay arrives home to find the police and Black's associates waiting for him. DJay turns himself in and tells prostitute Nola to safeguard his writing pad with his lyrics on it, also placing her in charge of sending his songs to radio stations. He then exchanges a glance with a tearful Shug before a brawl breaks out after one of Black's crew sucker punches him. DJay is charged with assault and possession of a firearm and is sentenced to 11 months in prison.

While serving his time, DJay is visited by Key and learns that Nola has successfully gotten radio DJs to play his songs, which have become local hits. The pair then prepare to discuss their future business plans. Two correctional officers ask DJay to listen to their demo. Humbled and flattered, DJay accepts.

Cast
 Terrence Howard as DeeJay
 Anthony Anderson as Key
 Taryn Manning as Nola
 Taraji P. Henson as Shug
DJ Qualls as Shelby
 Ludacris as Skinny Black
 Paula Jai Parker as Lexus
 Elise Neal as Yevette
 Juicy J as Tigga
 Haystak as Mickey
 DJ Paul as R.L.
 I-20 as Yellow Jacket
 Isaac Hayes as Arnel

Production

Terrence Howard initially turned down the role of DJay. He reportedly was attempting to avoid being typecast as a "pimp" archetype. However, after recognizing the complexity and depth of the character, he reversed his earlier decision and took on the role.

As concepts of both hustle and flow are unique to African American culture, it turned out to be nearly impossible to find proper translations for international release of the film. For example, the Russian translation of the title means "The bustle and the motion". The Italian title is appended with "Il colore della musica" which means "The color of music".

The film experienced many years of near-misses and outright rejection from major studios and potential financiers before finally being backed by its longtime supporter John Singleton. In the DVD extras Singleton says that he decided at last to put up the money himself because he was exasperated at his friends' not getting what their film deserved.

Critical reception
On Rotten Tomatoes the film holds an approval rating of 83% based on 160 reviews, with an average rating of 7.3/10. The site's critical consensus reads: "Hustle & Flow is gritty and redemptive, with a profound sense of place and exciting music." Metacritic gives the film a weighted average score of 68 out of 100 based on 37 critics, indicating "generally favorable reviews".

The Boston Globe said, "Some will find it chicly inspired, recalling blaxploitation's heyday with its grimy urban realism. Some will find it corny, absurd, and a limited view of options for disenfranchised African-Americans." According to Entertainment Weekly, "The home-studio recording sequences in Hustle & Flow are funky, rowdy, and indelible. Brewer gives us the pleasure of watching characters create music from the ground up."

Accolades

Soundtrack

The soundtrack was released on July 12, 2005, by Grand Hustle and Atlantic Records. The album centers on Southern hip hop.

See also 

 List of hood films

References

External links

 
 
 
 
 
 Sundance Films Honored

2005 drama films
2005 independent films
2000s English-language films
2000s hip hop films
2000s musical drama films
American independent films
African-American drama films
American musical drama films
Midlife crisis films
Films about prostitution in the United States
Films directed by Craig Brewer
Films scored by Scott Bomar
Films set in Memphis, Tennessee
Films shot in Tennessee
Films that won the Best Original Song Academy Award
Films with screenplays by Craig Brewer
Midlife crisis films
Hood films
MTV Films films
Paramount Vantage films
Sundance Film Festival award winners
2000s American films
African-American films